Elkin may refer to:

Places
 Elkin, North Carolina, a town in Elkin Township
 Elkin Township, Surry County, North Carolina, containing the town of Elkin
 Elkin Municipal Airport, of the Town of Elkin, North Carolina
 Elkin Bridges, bridges near Elkin, North Carolina
 Elkin's Ferry Battleground, site of Civil War Battle of Elkin's Ferry
 Elkin Creek Guest Ranch Airport, British Columbia, Canada

Other uses
 Elkin (name)

See also 
 Elkins (disambiguation)